"Talkin' Out da Side of Ya Neck!" is the first single from Dem Franchize Boyz's third studio album Our World, Our Way. It is produced by Bangladesh.

Charts

References

2008 singles
Dem Franchize Boyz songs
Song recordings produced by Bangladesh (record producer)
2008 songs
So So Def Recordings singles
Songs written by Bangladesh (record producer)